Huntsville High School was a public high school located in Huntsville, Tennessee.

History
Huntsville High School was established in 1932.

Notable alumni
John Duncan Sr., politician

References

1932 establishments in Tennessee
Education in Scott County, Tennessee
Educational institutions established in 1932
Public high schools in Tennessee